The 2020 Indiana Attorney General election was held on November 3, 2020, to elect the Attorney General of the U.S. state of Indiana. The Democratic primary convention was scheduled for June 13, 2020. The Republican primary convention was scheduled with a live stream on June 18, 2020, followed by mail-in voting between June 22 and July 9.

Incumbent Attorney General Curtis Hill ran for re-election, but was defeated at the Republican nominating convention by former U.S. Representative Todd Rokita, who eventually won after three rounds of votes. Jonathan Weinzapfel, former mayor of Evansville, narrowly won the Democratic nomination at the party's nominating convention. 

In the general election, Rokita defeated Weinzapfel by approximately 500,000 votes, a margin of more than 16 percentage points. Due to a smaller third-party vote, both Rokita and Weinzapfel received a larger percentage of the vote than their party's candidates in the state's presidential and gubernatorial elections. Rokita carried Tippecanoe County, which voted for Democrat Joe Biden in the presidential race, while Weinzapfel carried his home of Vanderburgh County, which voted for Republicans Donald Trump and Eric Holcomb in the presidential and gubernatorial races.

Republican convention

Candidates

Nominee
Todd Rokita, former U.S. Representative from Indiana's  district

Eliminated at convention
Nate Harter, Decatur County prosecutor
Curtis Hill, incumbent Attorney General
John Westercamp, attorney

Withdrawn
Adam Krupp, former Indiana Department of Revenue Commissioner (endorsed Harter)

Endorsements

Results

Democratic convention

Candidates

Nominee
Jonathan Weinzapfel, former Mayor of Evansville

Eliminated at convention
Karen Tallian, Indiana State Senator

Results

General election

Predictions

Polling

Curtis Hill vs. Karen Tallian

Curtis Hill vs. Jonathan Weinzapfel

Results

Results by county

Notes

See also
2020 Indiana elections

References

External links
Official campaign websites
 Jonathan Weinzapfel (D) for Attorney General
 Todd Rokita (R) for Attorney General

Attorney General
Indiana